Collins is a village in Saint Philip Parish, Antigua and Barbuda.

Demographics 
Collins has one enumeration district, ED 61500 (Long Lane_Collins).

Collins had a population of 118 in 2011.

Census Data (2011) 
Source:

References 

Saint Philip Parish, Antigua and Barbuda
Populated places in Antigua and Barbuda